Raymundo Torres may refer to:

 Raymundo Torres (boxer) (1941–1972), Mexican boxer
 Raymundo Torres (footballer) (born 1984), Mexican footballer
 Ray Torres (1958–2012), Mexican baseball player